I Do Not Care If We Go Down in History as Barbarians is a 2018 internationally co-produced black comedy film directed by Radu Jude.

Plot
The film examines the 1941 Odessa massacre by the Romanians on the Eastern Front in 1941. The title is pulled from a speech by Romanian Minister of Foreign Affairs Mihai Antonescu to the Council of Ministers preceding the massacre of around 34,000 Jews, Roma people, and Ukrainians. 

Most of the film is about the research and preparation for a public re-enactment of an antisemitic massacre, and the roadblocks faced by Mariana (Ioana Iacob), a director fighting against local government and her hired re-enactors. Throughout the film there are discussions of war crimes committed by Romania during the Second World War and the country's involvement in the Holocaust. It also deals heavily with popular depictions of fascist leader Ion Antonescu, antisemitism, and fascism apologia in Romania after the fall of communism.

Cast

 Ioana Iacob as Mariana
 Alex Bogdan as Traian
 Alexandru Dabija as Movila

Production 
In the film, a stylized reenactment of the Romanian campaign on Odessa is played on the forecourt (now a parking lot) in front of the Royal Palace of Bucharest.

Accolades
The film was selected as the Romanian entry for the Best Foreign Language Film at the 91st Academy Awards, but it was not nominated. It won the Crystal Globe for the best feature film at the 2018 Karlovy Vary International Film Festival.

See also
 List of submissions to the 91st Academy Awards for Best Foreign Language Film
 List of Romanian submissions for the Academy Award for Best Foreign Language Film

References

External links
 

2018 films
2018 black comedy films
Romanian historical comedy films
2010s Romanian-language films
Bulgarian comedy films
Bulgarian historical films
Czech historical comedy films
Czech World War II films
French black comedy films
French historical comedy films
French World War II films
German black comedy films
German historical comedy films
German World War II films
Films directed by Radu Jude
Eastern Front of World War II films
Films set in 1941
Crystal Globe winners
2010s French films
2010s German films